Dežno pri Makolah is a settlement in the Municipality of Makole in northeastern Slovenia. It lies in the hills above the right bank of the Dravinja River. The area is part of the traditional region of Styria. It is now included with the rest of the municipality in the Drava Statistical Region.

Name
The settlement was recorded in written sources in 1220–30 as in Bratyssen, in Radgassen, and in Dragozla (and in 1265–67 as in Deschen). The name is probably derived from the common noun deža 'squat round vessel', also used in the metaphorical sense 'hollow carved by water'. The name of the settlement was changed from Dežno to Dežno pri Makolah (literally, 'Dežno near Makole') in 1953.

References

External links
Dežno pri Makolah at Geopedia

Populated places in the Municipality of Makole